The 1959–60 Coppa Italia was the 13th Coppa Italia, the major Italian domestic cup. The competition was won by Juventus.

First round 

p=after penalty shoot-out

Second round 
Milan and Atalanta are added.

Round of 16 
Genoa, Torino, Venezia, Fiorentina, Juventus, Bologna, Lazio, Internazionale are added.

Quarter-finals 

* Juventus qualify after drawing of lots.

Semi-finals

Third place match

Final

Top goalscorers

External links
rsssf.com

Coppa Italia seasons
1959–60 domestic association football cups
Copa